The United Nations Convention on Contracts for the International Sale of Goods (CISG), sometimes known as  the Vienna Convention, is a multilateral treaty that establishes a uniform framework for international commerce. As of 2022, it has been ratified by 95 countries, representing two-thirds of world trade. 

The CISG facilitates international trade by removing legal barriers among state parties (known as "Contracting States") and providing uniform rules that govern most aspects of a commercial transaction, such as contract formation, the means of delivery, parties' obligations, and remedies for breach of contract. Unless expressly excluded by the contract, the convention is automatically incorporated into the domestic laws of Contracting States and applies directly to a transaction of goods between their nationals. 

The CISG is rooted in two earlier international sales treaties first developed in 1930 by the International Institute for the Unification of Private Law (UNIDROIT). When neither convention garnered widespread global support, the United Nations Commission on International Trade Law (UNCITRAL) drew from the existing texts to develop the CISG in 1968. A draft document was submitted to the Conference on the International Sale of Goods held in Vienna, Austria in 1980. Following weeks of negotiation and modification, the CISG was unanimously approved and opened for ratification; it came into force on 1 January 1988 following ratification by 11 countries.

The CISG is considered one of the greatest achievements of UNCITRAL and the "most successful international document" in unified international sales law, due to its parties representing "every geographical region, every stage of economic development and every major legal, social and economic system". Of the uniform law conventions, the CISG has been described as having "the greatest influence on the law of worldwide trans-border commerce", including among nonmembers. It is also the basis of the annual Willem C. Vis International Commercial Arbitration Moot, one of the largest and most prominent international moot court competitions in the world.

Adoption

As of 5 May 2020, the following 95 states have ratified, acceded to, approved, accepted, or succeeded to the convention:

The convention has been signed, but not ratified, by Ghana and Venezuela.

Language, structure, and content
The CISG is written using "plain language that refers to things and events for which there are words of common content". This was intended to allow national legal systems to be transcended through the use of a lingua franca that would be mutually intelligible among different cultural, legal, and linguistic groups. and to avoid "words associated with specific domestic legal nuances". As is customary in UN conventions, all six official languages of the UN are equally authentic.

The CISG is divided into four parts:

Part I: Sphere of Application and General Provisions (Articles 1–13)

The CISG applies to contracts of the sale of goods between parties whose places of business are in different States, when the States are Contracting States (Article 1(1)(a)). Given the significant number of Contracting States, this is the usual path to the CISG's applicability.

The CISG also applies if the parties are situated in different countries (which need not be Contracting States) and the conflict of law rules lead to the application of the law of a Contracting State. For example, a contract between a Japanese trader and a Brazilian trader may contain a clause that arbitration will be in Sydney under Australian law with the consequence that the CISG would apply. A number of States have declared they will not be bound by this condition.

The CISG is intended to apply to commercial goods and products only. With some limited exceptions, it does not apply to personal, family, or household goods, nor does it apply to auctions, ships, aircraft, or intangibles and services. The position of computer software is 'controversial' and will depend upon various conditions and situations.

Importantly, parties to a contract may exclude or vary the application of the CISG.

Interpretation of the CISG must consider the "international character" of the convention, the need for uniform application, and the need for good faith in international trade.

A key point of controversy is whether or not a contract requires a written memorial to be binding. The CISG allows for a sale to be oral or unsigned, but in some countries, contracts are not valid unless written.  In many nations, however, oral contracts are accepted, and those States had no objection to signing, so States with a strict written requirement exercised their ability to exclude those articles relating to oral contracts, enabling them to sign as well.

The CISG, by its own definition, does not govern all aspects of sales contracts subject to its application. The matters listed in its Article 4 must be filled in by the applicable national law under due consideration of the conflict of law rules applicable at the place of jurisdiction. Gaps referring to matters that are governed by the CISG but not expressly settled therein (a gap praeter legem), however, are to be preferably filled in accordance with "the principles on which [the CISG] is based," and only in the absence of those should national law be applied.

Part II: Formation of the Contract (Articles 14–24)

An offer to contract must be addressed to a person, be sufficiently definite – that is, describe the goods, quantity, and price – and indicate an intention for the offeror to be bound on acceptance. The CISG does not appear to recognise common law unilateral contracts but, subject to clear indication by the offeror, treats any proposal not addressed to a specific person as only an invitation to make an offer. Further, where there is no explicit price or procedure to implicitly determine price, then the parties are assumed to have agreed upon a price based upon that 'generally charged at the time of the conclusion of the contract for such goods sold under comparable circumstances'.

Generally, an offer may be revoked provided the withdrawal reaches the offeree before or at the same time as the offer, or before the offeree has sent an acceptance.  Some offers may not be revoked; for example when the offeree reasonably relied upon the offer as being irrevocable. The CISG requires a positive act to indicate acceptance; silence or inactivity are not an acceptance.

The CISG attempts to resolve the common situation where an offeree's reply to an offer accepts the original offer, but attempts to change the conditions. The CISG says that any change to the original conditions is a rejection of the offer—it is a counter-offer—unless the modified terms do not materially alter the terms of the offer. Changes to price, payment, quality, quantity, delivery, liability of the parties, and arbitration conditions may all materially alter the terms of the offer.

Part III: Sale of Goods (Articles 25–88)

Articles 25–88; sale of goods, obligations of the seller, obligations of the buyer, passing of risk, obligations common to both buyer and seller.

The CISG defines the duty of the seller, 'stating the obvious', as the seller must deliver the goods, hand over any documents relating to them, and transfer the property in the goods, as required by the contract.  Similarly, the duty of the buyer is to take all steps 'which could reasonably be expected' to take delivery of the goods, and to pay for them.

Generally, the goods must be of the quality, quantity, and description required by the contract, be suitably packaged and fit for purpose.  The seller is obliged to deliver goods that are not subject to claims from a third party for infringement of industrial or intellectual property rights in the State where the goods are to be sold.  The buyer is obliged to promptly examine the goods and, subject to some qualifications, must advise the seller of any lack of conformity within 'a reasonable time' and no later than within two years of receipt.

The CISG describes when the risk passes from the seller to the buyer but it has been observed that in practice most contracts define the seller's delivery obligations quite precisely by adopting an established shipment term, such as FOB and CIF.

Remedies of the buyer and seller depend upon the character of a breach of the contract.  If the breach is fundamental, then the other party is substantially deprived of what it expected to receive under the contract.  Provided that an objective test shows that the breach could not have been foreseen, then the contract may be avoided and the aggrieved party may claim damages. Where part performance of a contract has occurred, then the performing party may recover any payment made or good supplied; this contrasts with the common law where there is generally no right to recover a good supplied unless title has been retained or damages are inadequate, only a right to claim the value of the good.

If the breach is not fundamental, then the contract is not avoided and remedies may be sought including claiming damages, specific performance, and adjustment of price.  Damages that may be awarded conform to the common law rules in Hadley v Baxendale but it has been argued the test of foreseeability is substantially broader and consequently more generous to the aggrieved party.

The CISG excuses a party from liability to a claim of damages where a failure to perform is attributable to an impediment beyond the party's, or a third party sub-contractor's, control that could not have been reasonably expected. Such an extraneous event might elsewhere be referred to as force majeure, and frustration of the contract.

Where a seller has to refund the price paid, then the seller must also pay interest to the buyer from the date of payment.  It has been said the interest rate is based on rates current in the seller's State '[s]ince the obligation to pay interest partakes of the seller's obligation to make restitution and not of the buyer's right to claim damages', though this has been debated.  In a mirror of the seller's obligations, where a buyer has to return goods the buyer is accountable for any benefits received.

Part IV: Final Provisions (Articles 89–101)
Articles 89–101 (final provisions) include how and when the Convention comes into force, permitted reservations and declarations, and the application of the convention to international sales where both States concerned have the same or similar law on the subject.

The Part IV Articles, along with the Preamble, are sometime characterized as being addressed "primarily to States", not to business people attempting to use the convention for international trade. They may, however, have a significant impact upon the CISG's practical applicability, thus requiring careful scrutiny when determining each particular case.

Commentary on the Convention
It has been remarked that the CISG expresses a practice-based, flexible and "relational" character. It places no or very few restrictions of form on formation or adjustment of contracts; in case of non-performance (or over-performance) it offers a wide array of interim measures before the aggrieved party must resort to avoiding the contract (e.g. unilateral pro-rated price reduction (Art. 50); suspension of performance (art. 71); the availability of cure as a matter of right of the defaulting party (subject to some reservations, Art. 48); choice between expectation and market-based damages, etc.); additionally, the CISG does not operate under a "perfect tender" rule and its criteria for conformity are functional rather than formal (art. 35). Additionally, its rules of interpretation rely heavily on custom as well as on manifest acts rather than on intent (Art. 8). The CISG does include a so-called Nachlass rule (i.e., legacy rule), but its scope is relatively limited. On the other hand, its good faith obligation may seem relatively limited and in any case obscure (Art. 7). All communications require "reasonable time."

Although the convention has been accepted by a large number of States, it has been the subject of some criticism.  For example, the drafting nations have been accused of being incapable of agreement on a code that "concisely and clearly states universal principles of sales law", and through the convention's invitation to interpret taking regard of the convention's "international character" gives judges the opportunity to develop "diverse meaning".  Put more bluntly, the CISG has been described as "a variety of vague standards and compromises that appear inconsistent with commercial interests".

A contrary view is that the CISG is "written in plain business language," which allows judges the opportunity to make the Convention workable in a range of sales situations.  It has been said "the drafting style is lucid and the wording simple and uncluttered by complicated subordinating clauses", and the "general sense" can be grasped on the first reading without the need to be a sales expert.

Uniform application of the CISG is problematic because of the reluctance of courts to use "solutions adopted on the same point by courts in other countries", resulting in inconsistent decisions.  For example, in a case involving the export to Germany by a Swiss company of New Zealand mussels with a level of cadmium in excess of German standards, the German Supreme Court held that it is not the duty of the seller to ensure that goods meet German public health regulations.  This contrasted with a later decision in which an Italian cheese exporter failed to meet French packaging regulations, and the French court decided it was the duty of the seller to ensure compliance with French regulations.

These two cases were held by one commentator to be an example of contradictory jurisprudence.  Another commentator, however, saw the cases as not contradictory, as the German case could be distinguished on a number of points.  The French court chose not to consider the German court's decision, in its published decision.  (Precedent, foreign or not, is not legally binding in civil law.)

CISG advocates are also concerned that the natural inclination of judges is to interpret the CISG using the methods familiar to them from their own State rather than attempting to apply the general principles of the convention or the rules of private international law.  This is despite the comment from one highly respected academic that 'it should be a rare, or non-existent, case where there are no relevant general principles to which a court might have recourse' under the CISG.  This concern was supported by research of the CISG Advisory Council which said, in the context of the interpretation of Articles 38 and 39, there is a tendency for courts to interpret the articles in the light of their own State's law, and some States have 'struggled to apply [the articles] appropriately'.  In one of a number of criticisms of Canadian court decisions to use local legislation to interpret the CISG, one commentator said the CISG was designed to 'replace existing domestic laws and caselaw,' and attempts to resolve gaps should not be by 'reference to relevant provisions of [local] sales law'.

Critics of the multiple language versions of the CISG assert it is inevitable the versions will not be totally consistent because of translation errors and the untranslatability of 'subtle nuances' of language.  This argument, though with some validity, would not seem peculiar to the CISG but common to any and all treaties that exist in multiple languages.  The reductio ad absurdum would seem to be that all international treaties should exist in only a single language, something which is clearly neither practical nor desirable.

Other criticisms of the convention are that it is incomplete, there is no mechanism for updating the provisions, and no international panel to resolve interpretation issues.  For example, the CISG does not govern the validity of the contract, nor does it consider electronic contracts. However, legal matters relating to the use of electronic communications in relation to contracts for international sale of goods have been eventually dealt with in a comprehensive manner in the United Nations Convention on the Use of Electronic Communications in International Contracts. Moreover, it is not to be forgotten that the CISG is complemented by the Convention on the Limitation Period in the International Sale of Goods with respect to the limitation of actions due to passage of time.

Despite the critics, a supporter has said '[t]he fact that the costly ignorance of the early days, when many lawyers ignored the CISG entirely, has been replaced by too much enthusiasm that leads to ... oversimplification, cannot be blamed on the CISG'.

Reservations
The relatively widespread adoption of the CISG stems from its allowing Contracting States to take exception to certain specified articles; this flexibility was instrumental in convincing states with disparate legal traditions to subscribe to an otherwise uniform code. Contracting States can lodge reservations, referred to therein as "declarations", which exempt them from certain provisions. Nevertheless, the vast majority of parties—69 of the current 92 Contracting States—have acceded to the Convention without any declaration.

Of the approximate quarter of parties that have taken reservations, most have done so with respect to one or some of the following:

opting out of article 1(1)(b) CISG, which allows for the application of the CISG in cases when the rules of private international law point at the law of a contracting State as the law applicable to the contract for sale of goods (article 95 CISG);
mandatory written form of the contract for sale of goods (articles 11, 12 and 96 CISG);
opting out of the application of Part II or Part III CISG (article 92 CISG);
not applying the CISG to contracts concluded between parties with place of business in "which have the same or closely related legal rules on matters governed" by the CISG (article 94 CISG).

Some existing declarations have been reviewed and withdrawn by States. The Nordic countries (except Iceland) had originally opted out of the application of Part II under Article 92, but rescinded this reservation and became party to Part II, except for trade among themselves (to which the CISG is not applied as a whole due to a declaration lodged under Article 94). Likewise, China, Latvia, Lithuania and Hungary withdrew their written form declaration, and the Czech Republic withdrew its declaration preventing the application of article 1(1)(b). The Government of Ukraine declared its intention to withdraw the "Written Form" declaration.

Some countries have expanded rather than restricted CISG application by removing one of the cumulative conditions for application within the CISG. For example, Israeli law stipulates that the CISG will apply equally to a party whose place of business is in a State that is not a Contracting State.

Major absentees
India, South Africa, Nigeria, and the United Kingdom are the major trading countries that have not yet ratified the CISG.

The absence of the United Kingdom, a leading jurisdiction for the choice of law in international commercial contracts, has been attributed variously to: the government not viewing its ratification as a legislative priority, a lack of interest from business in supporting ratification, opposition from a number of large and influential organisations, a lack of public service resources, and a danger that London would lose its edge in international arbitration and litigation. In 2020, the British Government informed that it had no plan to join the CISG.

There is significant academic disagreement as to whether Taiwan, and Macau are deemed parties to the CISG due to China's status as a party. The issue has been clarified with respect to Hong Kong with the deposit of a declaration of extension of territorial application by China. The Convention was written in Hong Kong law through the Sale of Goods (United Nations Convention) Ordinance, which commenced on 1 December 2022.

Future directions
Greater acceptance of the CISG will come from three directions. First, it is likely that within the global legal profession, as the numbers of new lawyers educated in the CISG increases, the existing Contracting States will embrace the CISG, appropriately interpret the articles, and demonstrate a greater willingness to accept precedents from other Contracting States.

Second, businesses will increasingly pressure both lawyers and governments to make international commercial disputes over the sale of goods less expensive, and reduce the risk of being forced to use a legal system that may be completely alien to their own. Both of these objectives can be achieved through use of the CISG.

Finally, UNCITRAL will arguably need to develop a mechanism to further develop the convention and to resolve conflicting interpretation issues.  This will make it more attractive to both business people and potential Contracting States.

Prospective Contracting States 
Ethiopia and Rwanda have adopted laws authorising the adoption of the CISG, which will enter into force in each country after the instrument of accession is deposited with the Secretary-General of the United Nations.

Differences with country legislation relating to the sale of goods

Depending on the country, the CISG can represent a small or significant departure from local legislation relating to the sale of goods, and in this can provide important benefits to companies from one contracting state that import goods into other states that have ratified the CISG.

Differences with U.S. legislation (the UCC)

In the U.S., all 50 states have, to varying degrees, adopted common legislation referred to as the Uniform Commercial Code ("UCC").  UCC Articles 1 (General Provisions) and 2 (Sales) are generally similar to the CISG.  However, the UCC differs from the CISG in some respects, such as the following areas that tend to reflect more general aspects of the U.S. legal system:

A detailed comparison chart has been prepared by Dr. Gizem Alper of the Institute of International Commercial Law at Pace Law School.

Nevertheless, because the U.S. has ratified the CISG, it has the force of federal law and supersedes UCC-based state law under the Supremacy Clause of the Constitution. Among the U.S. reservations to the CISG is the provision that the CISG will apply only as to contracts with parties located in other CISG Contracting States, a reservation permitted by the CISG in Article 95. Therefore, in international contracts for the sale of goods between a U.S. entity and an entity of a Contracting State, the CISG will apply unless the contract's choice of law clause specifically excludes CISG terms.

Conversely, in "international" contracts for the sale of goods between a U.S. entity and an entity of a non-Contracting State, to be adjudicated by a U.S. court, the CISG will not apply, and the contract will be governed by the domestic law applicable according to private international law rules.

Differences with UK legislation
The sale of goods in the UK is regulated by:

the Sale of Goods Act 1979, (SGA) which is designed for both business-to-consumer and business-to-business transactions
the Consumer Rights Act 2015 (CRA: 2015) which provides solely for business-to-consumer transactions

Although the rights are broadly similar in business-to-consumer and business-to-business transactions, the remedies differ. Broadly speaking, the rights for these transactions are also similar across EU states.

See also

United Nations Commission on International Trade Law
Convention on the Limitation Period in the International Sale of Goods
United Nations Convention on the Use of Electronic Communications in International Contracts
Commercial law
International Commercial Terms (Incoterms)
International trade
International trade law
Uniform Commercial Code (UCC)

Notes

Footnotes

References
Pace CISG Database, iicl.law.pace.edu
Andersen, Camilla Baasch & Schroeter, Ulrich G. (eds.), Sharing International Commercial Law across National Boundaries: Festschrift for Albert H. Kritzer on the Occasion of his Eightieth Birthday, London: Wildy, Simmonds & Hill (2008)
Bonell, Michael and Liguori, Fabio, 'The U.N. Convention on the International Sale of Goods: A Critical Analysis of Current International Case Law' (1997) 2 Revue de Droit Uniforme 385.
CISG-AC Opinion No 2, Examination of the Goods and Notice of Non-Conformity – Articles 38 and 39, 7 June 2004. Rapporteur: Professor Eric Bergsten, Emeritus, Pace University New York 6, 7.
Dholakia, Shishir, 'Ratifying the CISG – India's Options' (2005) Celebrating Success: 25 Years United Nations Convention on Contracts for the International Sale of Goods (Collation of Papers at UNCITRAL SIAC Conference 22–23 September 2005, Singapore) 186.
Felemegas, John, 'The United Nations Convention on Contracts for the International Sale of Goods: Article 7 and Uniform Interpretation (2000)' Pace Review of the Convention on Contracts for the International Sale of Goods (CISG).
Ferrari, Franco, 'What Sources of Law for Contracts for the International Sale of Goods? Why One Has to Look Beyond the CISG' (2005) 25 International Review of Law and Economics 314.
Graffi, Leonardo, 'Case Law on the Concept of "Fundamental Breach" in the Vienna Sales Convention, Revue de droit des affaires internationales / International Business Law Journal (2003) No. 3, 338–349.
Hellner, Jan, 'The UN Convention on International Sales of Goods – An Outsider's View' in Erik Jayme (ed) Ius Inter Nationes: Festschrift fur Stefan Riesenfeld (1983) 72.
Kastely, Amy, 'Unification and Community: A Rhetorical Analysis of the United Nations Sales Convention' (1988) 8 Northwestern Journal of International Law and Business 574.
Kolsky Lewis, Meredith, 'Comments on Luke Nottage's Paper' (2005) 36 Victoria University of Wellington Law Review 859.
Martinussen, Roald, "Overview of International CISG Sales Law. Basic Contract Law according to the UN Convention on Contracts for the International Sale of Goods(CISG)." 120.
Moss, Sally, 'Why the United Kingdom Has Not Ratified the CISG' (2005) 1 Journal of Law and Commerce 483.
Pace International Law Review, (ed) Review of the Convention on Contracts for the International Sale of Goods (CISG) (1st ed, 1998).
Rossett, Arthur, 'Critical Reflections on the United Nations Convention on Contracts for the International Sale of Goods' (1984) 45 Ohio State Law Journal 265.
Schlechtriem, Peter, Uniform Sales Law – The UN-Convention on Contracts for the International Sale of Goods (1st ed, 1986).
Schlechtriem, Peter & Schwenzer, Ingeborg (eds.), Kommentar zum Einheitlichen UN-Kaufrecht – CISG - (6th ed, 2013).
Ingeborg Schwenzer & Edgardo Muñoz (eds.), Schlechtriem & Schwenzer: Comentario sobre la convencion de las Naciones Unidas sobre los contratos de compraventa internacional de mercaderias, Cizur Menor (Navarra): Editorial Aranzadi SA 2011,  .
Schroeter, Ulrich G., UN-Kaufrecht und Europäisches Gemeinschaftsrecht: Verhältnis und Wechselwirkungen Munich: Sellier. European Law Publishers (2005)
Sharma, Rajeev, 'The United Nations Convention On Contracts For The International Sale of Goods: The Canadian Experience' (2005) 36 Victoria University of Wellington Law Review 847.
United States Department of Commerce, 'The U.N. Convention on Contracts for the International Sale of Goods' https://web.archive.org/web/20070505032243/http://www.osec.doc.gov/ogc/occic/cisg.htm at 22 December 2007.
Verweyen, Foerster, Toufar Handbuch des Internationalen Warenkaufs UN-Kaufrechts (CISG) Boorberg Publishing Munich (2nd Edition, 2008) 
Whittington, Nicholas, 'Comment on Professor Schwenzer's Paper' (2005) 36 Victoria University of Wellington Law Review 809.
Zeller, Bruno, CISG and the Unification of International Trade Law (1st ed, 2007).
Ziegel, Jacob, 'The Future of the International Sales Convention from a Common Law Perspective' (2000) 6 New Zealand Business Law Quarterly 336.

External links
Text of the CISG and ratifications
United Nations Status of Treaties: United Nations Convention on Contracts for the International Sale of Goods
CISG Advisory Council (CISG-AC)
Uniform Sales Law (CISG): Synopsis of selected texts / Compilation of texts
Pace Law School database on the CISG and International Commercial Law.
Online Annotated Text of the CISG
UCC- CISG Comparison
US Department of Commerce Commentary
CISG online Database of the University of Basel, Switzerland
CISG-France Application of the CISG by French courts
 Introductory note by Harry M. Flechtner, procedural history note and audiovisual material on the United Nations Convention on Contracts for the International Sale of Goods in the Historic Archives of the United Nations Audiovisual Library of International Law
 Lecture by Harry M. Flechtner entitled The United Nations Convention on Contracts for the International Sale of Goods (CISG), Lecture I: Purposes, Background, History, Nature, Scope and Application in the Lecture Series of the United Nations Audiovisual Library of International Law
 Lecture by Harry M. Flechtner entitled The United Nations Convention on Contracts for the International Sale of Goods (CISG), Lecture II: Issues Covered and Key Substantive Provisions in the Lecture Series of the United Nations Audiovisual Library of International Law

United Nations treaties
Incoterms
United Nations Convention on Contracts for the International Sale of Goods
United Nations Convention on Contracts for the International Sale of Goods
United Nations Convention on Contracts for the International Sale of Goods
United Nations Convention on Contracts for the International Sale of Goods
Commercial treaties
Treaties of Albania
Treaties of Argentina
Treaties of Armenia
Treaties of Australia
Treaties of Austria
Treaties of Azerbaijan
Treaties of Bahrain
Treaties of the Byelorussian Soviet Socialist Republic
Treaties of Belgium
Treaties of Benin
Treaties of Bosnia and Herzegovina
Treaties of Brazil
Treaties of Bulgaria
Treaties of Burundi
Treaties of Canada
Treaties of Chile
Treaties of the People's Republic of China
Treaties of Colombia
Treaties of the Republic of the Congo
Treaties of Croatia
Treaties of Cuba
Treaties of Cyprus
Treaties of Czechoslovakia
Treaties of the Czech Republic
Treaties of Denmark
Treaties of the Dominican Republic
Treaties of Ecuador
Treaties of Egypt
Treaties of El Salvador
Treaties of Estonia
Treaties of Finland
Treaties of France
Treaties of Gabon
Treaties of Georgia (country)
Treaties of West Germany
Treaties of East Germany
Treaties of Greece
Treaties of Guinea
Treaties of Guyana
Treaties of Honduras
Treaties of the Hungarian People's Republic
Treaties of Iceland
Treaties of Ba'athist Iraq
Treaties of Israel
Treaties of Italy
Treaties of Japan
Treaties of Kyrgyzstan
Treaties of Latvia
Treaties of Lebanon
Treaties of Lesotho
Treaties of Lithuania
Treaties of Luxembourg
Treaties of Liberia
Treaties of Madagascar
Treaties of Mauritania
Treaties of Mexico
Treaties of Mongolia
Treaties of Montenegro
Treaties of the Netherlands
Treaties of New Zealand
Treaties of North Korea
Treaties of Norway
Treaties of Paraguay
Treaties of Peru
Treaties of Poland
Treaties of South Korea
Treaties of Moldova
Treaties of Romania
Treaties of the Soviet Union
Treaties of San Marino
Treaties of Serbia and Montenegro
Treaties of Yugoslavia
Treaties of Singapore
Treaties of Slovakia
Treaties of Slovenia
Treaties of Spain
Treaties of Saint Vincent and the Grenadines
Treaties of Sweden
Treaties of Switzerland
Treaties of Syria
Treaties of North Macedonia
Treaties of Turkey
Treaties of Uganda
Treaties of the Ukrainian Soviet Socialist Republic
Treaties of the United States
Treaties of Uruguay
Treaties of Uzbekistan
Treaties of Vietnam
Treaties of Zambia
1980 in Austria
Treaties extended to Aruba
Treaties extended to Greenland
Treaties extended to the Faroe Islands
Treaties extended to West Berlin